Lone Oak Independent School District is a public school district based in Lone Oak, Texas USA. Located in Hunt County, a small portion of the district extends into Rains County. It covers 98 square miles.

The district is managed by a seven-member board. The superintendent is Janeé Carter. The district educates around 860 students, in four schools, and employs approximately 65 teachers.

Standard & Poor's rated its general obligation debt as 'A'. They described the financial position as "consistently strong" in view of state support for its operations.

The district was the subject of a Texas Supreme Court case in July 1974. A student challenged a school regulation that prohibits married students from participating in extra-curricular activities. The court decided that this was a matter for the district's board to decide on the policy. This was upheld on appeal.

In 2009, the school district was rated "recognized" by the Texas Education Agency.

Schools
 Lone Oak High School (Grades 9-12)
 Lone Oak Middle School (Grades 6-8)
 Lone Oak Elementary School (Grades PK-5)

References

External links
 
 

School districts in Hunt County, Texas
School districts in Rains County, Texas